Protacraga is a genus of moths in the Epipyropidae family.

Species
Protacraga micans Hopp, 1924

Former species
Protacraga nigerella (Dognin, 1923)

References

Epipyropidae
Zygaenoidea genera